Tracey West (born October 1, 1965) is a children's book author who has written for many different licensed series, including Pokémon and SpongeBob SquarePants.

Life 
Tracey West was born and brought up in New Jersey, United States. She has written for Pokémon, SpongeBob SquarePants, Teen Titans, and The Powerpuff Girls. She has also written her own original series Pixie Tricks and Dragon Masters. West started her books in the 2000s and has written over 200 books for children.

In 2015, her novelization of the film Penguins of Madagascar was nominated for the Scribe Award by the International Association of Media Tie-In Writers.

References

External links
 
 
 Jayne Harvey and Coco Simon (shared pseudonyms) at LC Authorities, 4 and 28 records
 Alyssa Crowne and Angela Darling (pseudonyms), 5 and 6 records

1965 births
American children's writers
Writers from New Jersey 
Place of birth missing (living people)
Living people
21st-century American women writers